Metal–insulator transitions are transitions of a material from a metal (material with good electrical conductivity of electric charges) to an insulator (material where conductivity of charges is quickly suppressed). These transitions can be achieved by tuning various ambient parameters such as temperature, pressure or, in case of a semiconductor, doping.

History 

The basic distinction between metals and insulators was proposed by Bethe, Sommerfeld and Bloch in 1928/1929. It distinguished between conducting metals (with partially filled bands) and nonconducting insulators. However, in 1937 de Boer and Evert Verwey reported that many transition-metal oxides (such as NiO) with a partially filled d-band were poor conductors, often insulating. In the same year, the importance of the electron-electron correlation was stated by Peierls. Since then, these materials as well as others exhibiting a transition between a metal and an insulator have been extensively studied, e.g. by Sir Nevill Mott, after whom the insulating state is named Mott insulator.

The first metal-insulator transition to be found was the Verwey transition of magnetite in the 1940s.

Theoretical description 

The classical band structure of solid state physics predicts the Fermi level to lie in a band gap for insulators and in the conduction band for metals, which means metallic behavior is seen for compounds with partially filled bands. However, some compounds have been found which show insulating behavior even for partially filled bands. This is due to the electron-electron correlation, since electrons cannot be seen as noninteracting. Mott considers a lattice model with just one electron per site. Without taking the interaction into account, each site could be occupied by two electrons, one with spin up and one with spin down. Due to the interaction the electrons would then feel a strong Coulomb repulsion, which Mott argued splits the band in two. Having one electron per-site fills the lower band while the upper band remains empty, which suggests the system becomes an insulator. This interaction-driven insulating state is referred to as a Mott insulator. The Hubbard model is one simple model commonly used to describe metal-insulator transitions and the formation of a Mott insulator.

Elementary Mechanisms 
Metal–insulator transitions(MIT) can be classified based on the origin of their transition. The most common MIT arises from intense electron-electron correlation as described by the Mott-Hubbard MIT.

On other occasions, the lattice itself through electron-phonon interactions can give rise to an MIT known as the Peierls MIT. An example of this Peierls insulator is the blue bronze K0.3MoO3, which undergoes MIT at T = 180 K.

Insulator behavior in metals can also arise from the distortions and lattice defects, the transition of which is known as the Anderson MIT.

Polarization Catastrophe 
The polarization catastrophe model describes the transition of a material from an insulator to a metal. This model considers the electrons in a solid to act as oscillators and the conditions for this transition to occur is determined by the number of oscillators per unit volume of the material. Since every oscillator has a frequency (ω0) we can describe the dielectric function of a solid as,

ε(ω) = 1+(Ne2/ε0m)/[ω02-(Ne2/3ε0m) -ω2-iω/tao] (1)

where ε(ω) is the dielectric function, N is the number of oscillators per unit volume, ω0 is the fundamental oscillation frequency, m is the oscillator mass, and ω is the excitation frequency.

For a material to be a metal, the excitation frequency (ω) must be zero by definition, which then gives us the static dielectric constant,

εs = 1+(Ne2/ε0m)/[ω02-(Ne2/3ε0m)] (2)

where εs is the static dielectric constant. If we rearrange equation (2) to isolate the number of oscillators per unit volume we get the critical concentration of oscillators (Nc) at which εs becomes infinite, indicating a metallic solid and the transition from an insulator to a metal.

Nc = 3ε0mω02/e2 (3)

This expression creates a boundary that defines the transition of a material from an insulator to a metal. This phenomenon is known as the polarization catastrophe.

The polarization catastrophe model also theorizes that, with a high enough density, and thus a low enough molar volume, any solid could become metallic in character. Predicting whether a material will be metallic or insulating can be done by taking the ratio R/V, where R is the molar refractivity, sometimes represented by A, and V is the molar volume. In cases where R/V is less than 1, the material will have non-metallic, or insulating properties, while an R/V value greater than one yields metallic character.

See also

References

Further reading 
 
 
  http://rmp.aps.org/abstract/RMP/v70/i4/p1039_1

Condensed matter physics
Phase transitions